Pierre Wuilleumier (1 January 1904 – 20 November 1979) was a 20th-century French scholar, normalian, professor of Latin language and literature at the Sorbonne and archaeologist.

Biography 
Pierre Wuilleumier held the chair of National Antiquities in Lyon from 1933. In 1940, he was responsible for the excavations of the ancient Theatre of Fourvière on the hill of Fourvière with Amable Audin. From 1941 to 1954, he directed two constituencies of Historic Antiquities in the Lyon region. He contributed to the magazine Gallia since its creation in 1942, in which he regularly published the results of excavations on the hill of Fourvière and the Lyon region.

In 1947, he led the excavations of the so-called  in Lyon.

Publications

Publication and translation of Latin authors 
He completed the publication and translation of Latin authors in the "Collection des Universités de France" by the éditions des Belles Lettres

 Cicero, Cato Maior de Senectute
 Tacitus, Histoires, in collaboration with Henri Le Bonniec and Joseph Hellegouarc'h
 Tacite, Annales, in collaboration with Henri Le Bonniec and Joseph Hellegouarc'h

Archaeological publications 
1939: Tarente, des origines à la conquête romaine, éd. De Boccard, Paris
1947: Le cloître de Saint-André-le-Bas à Vienne, in collaboration with J. Déniau, Jules Formigé, E.-L. Albrand, éditions Audin, Lyon, 55 p., 8 planches hors-texte 
1951: Fouilles de Fourvière à Lyon, preface by Édouard Herriot, series Fouilles et monuments archéologiques en France métropolitaine, CNRS, 85 pages, 8 plans, 20 planches hors texte
1953: Lyon, métropole des Gaules, Belles Lettres, 118 p. Read online
1963: Inscriptions latines des Trois Gaules, CNRS, 256 pages, XVIIe supplément à la revue Gallia
1964: Laet Sigfried, minutes of reading published in L'antiquité classique, volume 33, fasc. 1. , 
1964: Amable Audin, minutes of reading published in Revue belge de philologie et d'histoire, vol. 42, n° 1, .

References

External links 
 Pierre Wuilleumier (1904-1979) on data.bnf.fr
 Pierre Wuilleumier, Fouilles de Fourvière à Lyon on Persée

20th-century French historians
French scholars of Roman history
French epigraphers
École Normale Supérieure alumni
Archaeologists from Paris
1904 births
1979 deaths
Academic staff of the University of Lyon
Academic staff of the University of Paris